Richard Henderson Whitworth (August 28, 1895 – March 1966) was an American pitcher in baseball's Negro leagues and pre-Negro leagues.

Born in St. Louis, Missouri, Whitworth played most of his career for Chicago teams the Chicago Union Giants and the Chicago American Giants.

On September 23, 1922, Whitworth broke his leg after he exited a vehicle in Anderson, Indiana and another car struck it, crashing into him. 

Research shows Whitworth stood 6' 5", and weighed 215 pounds.

He died at the age of 70 in St. Louis, Missouri.

References

External links
 and Baseball-Reference Black Baseball stats and Seamheads

1895 births
1966 deaths
Chicago American Giants players
Hilldale Club players
Leland Giants players
20th-century African-American sportspeople